Mannamkuzhi Stadium is a stadium in Uppala. It is the biggest stadium in Kasaragod district, Kerala. MASC- Mannamkuzhi Arts and Sports Club is also one of the teams which controls over Mannamkuzhi Stadium along with Citizen and MCC Uppala.

References

Buildings and structures in Kasaragod district
Sports venues in Kerala
Year of establishment missing